Apollo's Fire, The Cleveland Baroque Orchestra is a popular and critically acclaimed period-instrument ensemble specializing in early music (Renaissance, Baroque and early Classical) based in Cleveland, Ohio.  The GRAMMY-winning ensemble unites a select pool of early music specialists from throughout North America and Europe.  Under the direction of Artistic Director Jeannette Sorrell, the ensemble has been noted internationally for creative and innovative programming, and praised by BBC Music Magazine for "forging a vibrant, life-affirming approach to early music... a seductive vision of musical authenticity."

Founding and early history
Named for the classical god of music and the sun, Apollo's Fire was founded in 1992 by the award-winning conductor and harpsichordist Jeannette Sorrell. Sorrell, who was 26 at the time, had assistance from Roger Wright, who was then Artistic Administrator of the Cleveland Orchestra. Sorrell came to the attention of Wright through recommendations from conducting faculty at the Aspen Music Festival and Tanglewood Music Festival where she had studied under Leonard Bernstein, Roger Norrington and others. Wright was handling the Cleveland Orchestra's search for an assistant conductor, and he invited Sorrell to an interview for the position.  The interview was conducted by Cleveland Orchestra Music Director Christoph von Dohnányi along with Roger Wright. During the interview, Dohnányi told Sorrell that there was "no point in finding time with the orchestra for her to audition, as the audience in Cleveland would never accept a woman as a conductor." Sorrell replied that she had not applied for this job, and her true goal was to work with a period-instrument orchestra. Following this encounter, Wright decided to help Sorrell launch a period-instrument orchestra.

Sorrell launched an ensemble dedicated to the baroque ideal that music should evoke the various Affekts or passions in listeners, using the 17th-century tools of rhetoric and drama. The orchestra received a start-up grant from the Cleveland Foundation in 1992, and made its debut to critical acclaim in June of that year. Apollo's Fire immediately began receiving touring invitations from concert series presenters, and has been an active touring ensemble since its first season. The group's recordings and concerts have been broadcast frequently on National Public Radio, Britain's BBC, Canada's CBC Radio 2, and the European Broadcasting Union since its 4th season.

In 2004 Sorrell launched a crossover/folk wing of Apollo's Fire – a troupe specializing in traditional music (Celtic, Appalachian, Sephardic), performed on period instruments in a historically informed aesthetic.  Apollo's Fire was awarded major grants through the NEA American Masterpieces initiative in 2009 and 2010, for Jeannette Sorrell's research, creation, and recording of the innovative crossover program, "Come to the River:  An Early American Gathering." This recording because a top-10 bestseller on Billboard Classical in 2011. The album was hailed by the American Record Guide as "one of the most joyous releases, intoxicated by the sheer joy of being alive."

European debut and international touring

Apollo's Fire made its London debut in 2010 in a sold-out concert at Wigmore Hall, with a BBC broadcast. The ensemble toured Europe again in 2011, 2014, 2015, and 2018, including sold-out concerts at the BBC Proms in London, Madrid's Royal Theatre, Bordeaux's Grand Théâtre de l'Opéra, Bergen's, Austria, major venues in Lisbon (Portugal) and Metz (FR), as well the Boston Early Music Festival series and Cal Performances at Berkeley/San Francisco.  Their London concert in 2014 was praised by The Daily Telegraph for "superlative music-making, combining European stylishness and American can-do entrepreneurialism" – and named one of the "Best 5 Classical Music Concerts of 2014."

Apollo's Fire has performed two major U.S. tours of the Monteverdi Vespers (2010 and 2014) and a 9-concert tour of the Brandenburg Concertos in 2013.  In 2013, Apollo's Fire became the first baroque orchestra to be taken onto the touring roster of Columbia Artists Management (CAMI) for exclusive representation. In 2019 they switched to the management of Opus 3 Artists.

In summer 2015, Apollo's Fire reached heightened international attention with its sold-out debuts at the Tanglewood Festival, the BBC Proms in London, and the Aldeburgh Festival (UK), as well as the Festival Paesaggi Musicali Toscani in Tuscany.  The tour program, "A Night at Bach's Coffeehouse," featured Brandenburg Concerto no. 5 with Jeannette Sorrell as harpsichord soloist. The Boston Musical Intelligencer wrote that Apollo's Fire "conquered Tanglewood," 

In 2015 Apollo's Fire also performed sold-out concerts at the Library of Congress (Washington) and the Metropolitan Museum of Art in New York City. In spring 2016, Sorrell led the orchestra in her dramatic conception of J.S. Bach's St John Passion, to critical acclaim from The New York Times which wrote, "Magnificent... the production belonged entirely to Ms. Sorrell, who devised the concept, which she called 'a dramatic presentation'... the orchestra was excellent... exquisite moments."

In 2017, Apollo's Fire returned to the Tanglewood Festival and made its debut at the Ravinia Festival. Both concerts were sold out.  The ensemble is scheduled to make its Carnegie Hall debut on March 22, 2018, and that concert is already sold out as of August 2017.

In its hometown of Cleveland, Ohio, Apollo's Fire has been unusually successful in building a large, grassroots audience, thanks to creative programming and the group's animated performance style. In the 2016-17 season the ensemble sold over 15,000 tickets at its home series.

Recordings
Apollo's Fire won a GRAMMY Award in 2019. The ensemble has released 26 commercial CDs, mostly on British label AVIE. Eight of the ensemble's CD releases have become best-sellers on the classical Billboard chart: the Claudio Monteverdi Vespers, J.S. Bach's Brandenburg Concertos & Harpsichord Concertos, a disc of G.F. Handel arias with soprano Amanda Forsythe titled The Power of Love (Billboard Classical #3, 2015), and Jeannette Sorrell's four crossover programs:  Come to the River – An Early American Gathering (Billboard Classical #9, 2011); Sacrum Mysterium: A Celtic Christmas Vespers (Billboard Classical #11, 2012); Sugarloaf Mountain – An Appalachian Gathering (Billboard Classical #5, 2015); and Sephardic Journey – Wanderings of the Spanish Jews (Billboard World Music Chart #2 and Billboard Classical #5, Feb. 2016).

In 2016, the album Sephardic Journey was praised by BBC Music Magazine as "revelatory… convivially theatrical… The soloists and instrumentalists are first-class, and Sorrell's arrangements are full of zip and colour"  and Sorrell's work was favorably compared to that of Jordi Savall.
In 2019, Apollo's Fire won a GRAMMY, shared with singer Karim Sulayman and conductor Jeannette Sorrell, for the 2018 album Songs of Orpheus.

Other recordings include Bach's St. John Passion; Michael Praetorius's Christmas Vespers (compiled and edited by Jeannette Sorrell); Antonio Vivaldi's La Folia (Madness) and Other Concertos; Wolfgang Amadeus Mozart's Requiem (with a new completion of the unfinished Lacrimosa, by René Schiffer); Monteverdi's L'Orfeo (with a reconstruction of the lost Bacchanale ending by René Schiffer); Handel's Dixit Dominus and Coronation Anthems; G.P. Telemann's Don Quixote and other suites and concertos; and albums of Mozart symphonies and concertos.

References

External links
Official Home Page
 videos

Musical groups from Cleveland
Musical groups established in 1992
Early music orchestras
Orchestras based in Ohio
1992 establishments in Ohio